Rewind Life is a 2011 Brazilian mystery-supernatural film directed and written by Luiz Sanetia. It stars Stela Marianno, Adriano Baluz, Marina Vásques, João Valzack and Emanuel Risain.

Plot
The film tells the story of two journalists investigating the mysterious death of a woman who got to discover the source of eternal life using some rare books stored inside the National Library. Vatican officials have come to Brazil to warn that the angel of darkness Lucifer is acting on Earth through some followers with the intent to possess immortality. However, the code is stored in one place in the confines of the human mind. And the reversal of life is the only option to save humanity.

Cast
 Stela Marianno ... Ana
 Adriano Baluz ... Beto
 Emanuel Risaint ... Husayn
 Calu Lobo ... Laura
 Samuel Cruz ... Priest Bruna
 João Valzack ... Pedro
 Gastón Stefani ... Lucas
 Viviane Adriano ... Teacher Débora
 Esther Delamare ... Dona Torres (Jéssica adult)
 Helena Dias ... Nurse
 Greyce Kelly ... Jéssica
 Marina Vásques ... Maria
 Reinaldo Fusco ... Librarian

External links
 
 

2011 films
Brazilian mystery films
2010s Portuguese-language films
2011 directorial debut films